In heat transfer, the thermal conductivity of a substance, k, is an intensive property that indicates its ability to conduct heat.  For most materials, the amount of heat conducted varies (usually non-linearly) with temperature.

Thermal conductivity is often measured with laser flash analysis. Alternative measurements are also established.

Mixtures may have variable thermal conductivities due to composition. Note that for gases in usual conditions, heat transfer by advection (caused by convection or turbulence for instance) is the dominant mechanism compared to conduction.

This table shows thermal conductivity in SI units of watts per metre-kelvin (W·m−1·K−1).  Some measurements use the imperial unit BTUs per foot per hour per degree Fahrenheit ( =

Sortable list

Analytical list
Thermal conductivities have been measured with longitudinal heat flow methods where the experimental arrangement is so designed to accommodate heat flow in only the axial direction, temperatures are constant, and radial heat loss is prevented or minimized.  For the sake of simplicity the conductivities that are found by that method in all of its variations are noted as L conductivities, those that are found by radial measurements of the sort are noted as R conductivities, and those that are found from periodic or transient heat flow are distinguished as P conductivities.  Numerous variations of all of the above and various other methods have been discussed by some G. K. White, M. J. Laubits, D. R. Flynn, B. O. Peirce and R. W. Wilson and various other theorists who are noted in an international Data Series from Purdue University, Volume I pages 14a–38a.

This concerns materials at various temperatures and pressures.

See also 
 Laser flash analysis
 List of insulation materials
 R-value (insulation)
 Thermal transmittance
 Specific heat capacity
 Thermal conductivity
 Thermal conductivities of the elements (data page)
 Thermal diffusivity
 Thermodynamics

References

Bibliography

External links
 Heat Conduction Calculator
 Thermal Conductivity Online Converter - An online thermal conductivity calculator
 Thermal Conductivities of Solders
 Thermal conductivity of air as a function of temperature can be found at James Ierardi's Fire Protection Engineering Site
 Non-Metallic Solids:  The thermal conductivities of non-metallic solids are found in about 1286 pages in the TPRC Data Series volume 2 at the PDF link here (Identifier ADA951936):  http://www.dtic.mil/docs/citations/ADA951936 with full text link https://apps.dtic.mil/dtic/tr/fulltext/u2/a951936.pdf retrieved February 2, 2019 at 10:15 PM EST.
 Gasses and Liquids:  The thermal conductivities of gasses and liquids are found in the TPRC Data Series volume 3 at the PDF link here (Identifier ADA951937):  http://www.dtic.mil/docs/citations/ADA951937 with full text link https://apps.dtic.mil/dtic/tr/fulltext/u2/a951937.pdf retrieved February 2, 2019 at 10:19 PM EST.
 Metals and Alloys:  The thermal conductivities of metals are found in about 1595 pages in the TPRC Data Series volume 1 at the PDF link here: http://www.dtic.mil/docs/citations/ADA951935 with full text link https://apps.dtic.mil/dtic/tr/fulltext/u2/a951935.pdf retrieved February 2, 2019 at 10:20 PM EST.
 Specific Heat and Thermal Radiation:  Primary sources are found in the TPRC data series volumes 4 — 9, links: https://apps.dtic.mil/dtic/tr/fulltext/u2/a951938.pdf, https://apps.dtic.mil/dtic/tr/fulltext/u2/a951939.pdf, https://apps.dtic.mil/dtic/tr/fulltext/u2/a951940.pdf, https://apps.dtic.mil/dtic/tr/fulltext/u2/a951941.pdf, https://apps.dtic.mil/dtic/tr/fulltext/u2/a951942.pdf and https://apps.dtic.mil/dtic/tr/fulltext/u2/a951943.pdf retrieved at various times February 2 and 3, 2019.
 Vacuums:  Vacuums and various levels of vacuums and the thermal conductivities of air at reduced pressures are known at http://www.electronics-cooling.com/2002/11/the-thermal-conductivity-of-air-at-reduced-pressures-and-length-scales/ retrieved February 2, 2019 at 10:44 PM EST.

Chemical properties
Physical quantities
Heat conduction
Technology-related lists
Heat transfer
Thermodynamics